St. Mary's Church, St. Mary the Virgin's Church, St. Mary Church, Saint Mary Church, or other variations on the name, is a commonly used name for specific churches of various Christian denominations.
Notable uses of the term may refer to:

Albania
 St. Mary's Monastery Church, Dhivër
 St. Mary's Church, Elbasan
 St. Mary's Monastery, Goranxi
 St. Mary's Church, Himarë
 St. Mary's Monastery, Kakome
 St. Mary's Monastery Church, Koshovicë
 St. Mary Church, Krujë
 St. Mary's Monastery Church, Lubonjë
 St. Mary's Church, Maligrad
 St. Mary's Church, Mbreshtan
 St. Mary's Church, Melçan
 St. Mary's Church, Moscopole
 St. Mary's Monastery Church, Piqeras
 St. Mary's Church, Surrel
 St. Mary's Monastery Church, Tranoshisht
 St. Mary's Church on Drianos, Zervat

Australia
 St Mary's Anglican Church, Busselton, Western Australia
 St Mary's Anglican Church, Kangaroo Point, Queensland
 St Mary's on the Sturt, Anglican church in South Australia
 St Mary's Roman Catholic Church (Maryborough, Queensland)

Azerbaijan
 Church of the Immaculate Conception, Baku

Belarus
 St. Mary's Church, Grodno

Belgium
 Saint Mary's Royal Church, Schaerbeek

Canada
 St. Mary's Church, Toronto
 St. Mary Armenian Apostolic Church, Toronto

Czech Republic
 Church of the Virgin Mary (Prague Castle)

Denmark
 St. Mary's Church, Sønderborg

Egypt
 Church of the Holy Virgin (Babylon El-Darag)
 Church of the Virgin Mary (Haret Zuweila)
 Saint Mary Church (Haret Elroum)

Falkland Islands
 St. Mary's Church, Falkland Islands

Faroe Islands
 St. Mary's Church, Tórshavn

Finland
 St. Mary's Church, Helsinki
 St. Mary's Church of Lappee, Lappeenranta
 St. Mary's Church, Turku

France 
 Church of St. Mary (Corneilla-de-Conflent)

Germany
 Church of the Assumption of the Blessed Virgin Mary, Frauenau, Bavaria
 Maria Regina Martyrum (St. Mary Queen of the Martyrs Church), Berlin
 St. Mary's Church, Berlin
 St. Marien am Behnitz, Berlin
 Liebfrauen, Frankfurt
 Marktkirche Unser Lieben Frauen (Liebfrauenkirche, Marienkirche), Halle
 St. Mary's Cathedral, Hamburg
 St. Mary's Church, Fuhlsbüttel, Hamburg
 Domkirche St. Marien, Sankt Georg, Hamburg
 St. Mary's Church, Helminghausen
 St. Mary's Church, Himmelpforten
 St. Mary's Church, Lübeck
 St Mary's Church, Marienberg
 St. Mary's Church, Mühlhausen
 Marienkirche, Neubrandenburg
 St. Mary's Church, Ramersdorf
 St. Mary's Church, Reutlingen
 St. Mary's Church, Rostock
 St. Mary's Church, Stralsund
 , a church with an 80 m high tower in Wismar
 Marienkirche, Wolfenbüttel
 Liebfrauenmünster, Wolframs-Eschenbach
 , a Gothic church with a 285 ft. spire in Zwickau
 Überwasserkirche, Münster

Hungary
 Church of St. Mary the Virgin, Budapest

India 
 Manarcad Church, Kottayam, Kerala
 Padri Ki Haveli (St. Mary's Church), Patna, Bihar
 St. Mary's Church, Chennai
 
 St. Mary's Jacobite Syrian Church, Marady
 St. Mary's Church, Pune
 St. Mary's Church, Secunderabad
 St. Mary's Church, Noida
 St. Mary's Church, in Vallavilai
 St. Mary's Church, Vijayawada
 St Mary's Church, Vendore, Thrissur district, Kerala

Iran 
 St. Mary Church, Urmia
 St. Mary Church, Isfahan
 Saint Mary Church of Tabriz
 Church of the Holy Mother of God, Darashamb, Julfa
 Sourp Asdvadzadzin (Sarnaq)

Ireland

County Donegal
 St. Mary's Church, Inis Cealtra

Dublin Region
 St Mary's Church, Haddington Road, Dublin
 St Mary's Church, Mary Street, Dublin

County Kildare
 St. Mary's Church, Castlemartin

County Kilkenny
 St. Mary's Church, Kilkenny
 St. Mary's Church, Callan
 St. Mary's Collegiate Church Gowran

County Offaly 
 Church of St. Mary, Pollagh

County Meath
 St Mary's Church, Navan

County Tipperary
 Old St. Mary's Church (Clonmel)

County Wexford
 St. Mary's Church, Kilmore, County Wexford
 St. Mary's Church, New Ross

County Westmeath
 St. Mary's Church of the Assumption, Kinnegad
 St. Mary's Church, Athlone
 St. Mary's Roman Catholic Church, Athlone
 St. Mary's Church, Collinstown
 Church of St. Mary, Moate
 Church of St. Mary, Raharney

Malta
 Parish Church of St. Mary, Attard
 St Mary's Chapel, Bir Miftuħ
 Parish Church of St. Mary, Birkirkara
 St Mary's Church, Għaxaq
 St Mary's Church, Gudja
 St Mary's Church, Mosta
 St Mary's Church, Mqabba
 Parish Church of the Assumption, Qrendi
 Cathedral of the Assumption, Gozo
 Parish Church of the Assumption of Mary, Żebbuġ, Gozo
 St Mary's Church, Żurrieq

Netherlands
 Protestant church of Bears
 Protestant church of Buitenpost
 Protestant church of Oentsjerk
 St Mary's Church, Rotterdam
 St. Mary's Church, Utrecht

New Zealand
 St Mary's Cathedral, Auckland
 St Mary's Cathedral, Wellington
 St Mary's Catholic Church, Hokitika
 St Mary's Church, Timaru
 Taranaki Cathedral, the Church of St Mary (historically known as St. Mary's Church)
 St Mary of the Angels, Wellington

Norway
 St Mary's Church, Bergen
 St Mary's Church, Oslo
 St Mary's Church, Gran, one of the Sister churches (Norway)
 St Mary's Church, Askim
 St Mary's Church, Lillehammer
 St Mary's Church, Stabekk

Pakistan
 St. Mary's Church, Gulberg
 St. Mary's Church, Sukkur

Philippines
 Church of Saint Mary the Virgin (Sagada)

Poland
 Blessed Virgin Mary Church, Pińczów
 St. Mary's Church, Katowice
 St. Mary's Basilica, Kraków
 St. Mary's Church, Gdańsk
 St. Mary's Church, Stargard
 Cathedral Basilica of the Assumption of the Blessed Virgin Mary, Kielce
 Collegiate Basilica of the Birth of the Blessed Virgin Mary, Wiślica
 Church of the Visitation of the Blessed Virgin Mary, Kraków
 Basilica of the Assumption of the Blessed Virgin Mary, Krzeszów
 Cathedral of the Blessed Virgin Mary, Płock
 Basilica of Our Lady of Licheń

Romania
 Church of the Virgin Mary, Focșani
 Church of the Virgin Mary, Galați

Slovakia
 Church of the Blessed Virgin Mary, Staré
 Church of the Virgin Mary (Senica)

Sri Lanka 
 St. Mary's Cathedral, Batticaloa
 St. Mary's Cathedral, Galle
 St. Mary's Cathedral, Jaffna
 St. Mary’s Church, Negombo

Switzerland
 Liebfrauenkapelle (Rapperswil) (St. Mary Chapel)

Syria
 Saint Mary Church of the Holy Belt, Homs

Tristan da Cunha
 St. Mary's Church, Edinburgh of the Seven Seas

United Arab Emirates
 St. Mary's Catholic Church, Dubai

United Kingdom

England
Bedfordshire
 St Mary's Church, Clophill
 Church of St Mary, Everton, Bedfordshire
 Church of St Mary the Virgin, Henlow
 St Mary's Church, Lower Gravenhurst
 Church of Saint Mary the Virgin, Harlington, Bedfordshire
 Church of St Mary the Virgin, Keysoe
 St Mary's Church, Luton
 Church of St Mary the Virgin, Northill
 St Mary's Church, Potsgrove
 Church of St Mary the Virgin, Salford, Bedfordshire
 Church of St Mary the Virgin, Shelton, North Bedfordshire
 St Mary's Church, Woburn
 Church of St Mary the Virgin, Wootton, Bedfordshire
 Church of St Mary the Virgin, Yielden

Berkshire
 Church of St Mary the Virgin, Aldermaston
 St Mary's Church, Lambourn Woodlands
 St Mary the Virgin Church, Langley
 St Mary's Parish Church, Slough
 St Mary's Church, Maidenhead
 Reading Minster (known also as the Minster Church of St Mary the Virgin)
 St Mary's Church, Castle Street, Reading
 St Mary's Church, Thatcham

Bristol
 St Mary's Church, Henbury
 St Mary Redcliffe

Buckinghamshire
 St Mary's Church, Old Amersham
 St Mary the Virgin's Church, Aylesbury
 St. Mary's Church, Bletchley
 St Mary Magdalene's Church, Boveney
 St. Mary's Church, Chesham
 St Mary the Virgin's Church, Fawley
 St Mary's Church, Fleet Marston
 St. Mary the Virgin, Great Brickhill
 St Mary's Church, Hardmead
 St Mary's Church, Hartwell
 St Mary's Church, Pitstone
 St. Mary's Church, Shenley

Cambridgeshire
 Church of St Mary the Great, Cambridge
 Little St Mary's, Cambridge
 St Mary's Church, Ely
 St Mary's Church, Huntingdon

Cheshire
 St Mary's Church, Acton
 St Mary's Chapel, Arley
 St Mary's Church, Astbury
 Church of St Mary the Virgin, Bosley
 St Mary's Church, Bruera
 St Mary's and St Michael's Church, Burleydam
 St Mary's Church, Coddington
 St Mary's Church, Congleton
 St Mary's Church, Crewe
 St Mary's Church, Disley
 St Mary's Church, Dodleston
 St Mary's Church, Eccleston
 St Mary and All Saints' Church, Great Budworth
 St Mary's Church, Hale
 St Mary's Church, Halton
 St Mary's Church, Handbridge
 St Mary's Chapel, High Legh
 Church of St Mary of the Angels, Hooton
 St Mary's Church, Lymm
 St Mary's Church, Nantwich
 St Mary's and St Helen's Church, Neston
 St Mary's Church, Nether Alderley
 St Mary's Church, Pulford
 St Mary's Church, Rostherne
 St Mary's Church, Sandbach
 St Mary's Church, Thornton-le-Moors
 St Mary's Church, Tilston
 St Mary's Church, Warrington
 St Mary's Church, Weaverham
 St Mary's Church, Whitegate
 St Mary's Church, Widnes
 Church of St Mary the Virgin, Wistaston

Cornwall
 St Mary's Church, St Mary's, Isles of Scilly
 St Mary's Old Church, St Mary's, Isles of Scilly
 St Mary the Virgin's Church, Week St Mary

Cumbria
 St Mary's Church, Abbeytown
 St Mary's Church, Allithwaite
 St Mary Magdalene's Church, Broughton-in-Furness
 St. Mary of Furness Roman Catholic Church, also known as St Mary's Church, Barrow-in-Furness
 St Mary's Church, Dalton-in-Furness
 St Mary's Church, Gosforth
 St Mary and St Michael's Church, Great Urswick
 St Mary's Church, Hethersgill
 St Mary's Church, Kirkby Lonsdale
 St Mary's Church, Penny Bridge
 St Mary's Church, Staveley
 St Mary's Church, Ulverston
 St Mary the Virgin's Church, Walney
 St Mary's Church, Walton
 St Mary's Church, Whicham
 St Mary's Church, Windermere
 St Mary's Church, Wreay

Derbyshire
 St Mary and St Laurence's Church, Bolsover
 St Mary's Church, Chaddesden
 St Mary the Virgin's Church, Denby
 St Mary's Church, Derby
 St Mary the Virgin's Church, Newton Solney
 St Mary the Virgin's Church, South Darley
 St. Mary's Church, Sutton cum Duckmanton
 St Mary the Virgin’s Church, Weston-on-Trent
 St Mary's Church, Wirksworth

Devon
 St Mary's Church, Appledore
 St Mary's Church, North Huish
 St Marychurch (village & parish), Torbay
 Church of St Mary the Virgin, Uffculme

Dorset
 St Mary's Church, Charminster
 St Mary's Church, Dorchester
 St Mary the Virgin, Gillingham, Dorset
 St Mary's Church, Long Crichel
 St Mary's Church, Longfleet
 St Mary's Church, Swanage
 St Mary the Virgin, Tarrant Crawford

Durham
 St Mary's Church, Hartlepool
 St Mary's Church, Stockton-on-Tees

East Riding of Yorkshire
 St Mary's Church, Beverley

East Sussex
 St Mary Magdalen's Church, Brighton
 St Mary the Virgin, Brighton
 St Mary's Church, Hampden Park, Eastbourne
 St Mary's Church, Glynde
 St Mary and St Abraam Coptic Orthodox Church, Hove
 St Mary's Church, Preston Park
 St Mary's Church, Ticehurst
 St Mary's Church, Westham
 St Mary and St Peter's Church, Wilmington

Essex
 St Mary's Church, Burnham on Crouch
 St Mary's Buttsbury
 St Mary's Church, Chickney
 Church of St Mary, Great Baddow
 St Mary the Virgin, Great Warley
 Church of St Mary the Virgin, Harlow
 St Mary's Church, Lawford
 St Mary the Virgin's Church, Little Bromley
 St Mary's Church, Mundon
 St Mary's Church, Prittlewell
 St Mary the Virgin's Church, Stansted Mountfitchet
 St Mary the Virgin Church, Wendens Ambo
 Old St Mary's Church, West Bergholt
 St Mary's Church, Widford

Gloucestershire
 St Mary's Church, Berkeley
 St Mary's Church, Beverston
 St Mary of the Angels Church, Brownshill
 St Mary's Church, Cheltenham
 St. Mary's Church, Fairford
 St Mary's Church, Kempley
 St Mary's Church, Little Washbourne
 Church of St Mary the Virgin, Meysey Hampton
 St Mary's Church, Shipton Solars
 St. Mary the Virgin, Wotton-under-Edge

Greater Manchester
 The Hidden Gem (St. Mary’s Roman Catholic Church)
 Church of St Mary the Virgin, Bowdon
 Church of St Mary the Virgin, Bury
 St Mary's Church, Cheadle
 St Mary the Virgin's Church, Deane
 Church of St Mary the Virgin, Eccles
 St Mary the Virgin's Church, Ellenbrook
 Church of St Mary, Hulme
 St Mary the Virgin's Church, Leigh
 St Mary's Church, Lower Ince
 St Mary's Church, Lowton
 St Mary's Church, Manchester
 Church of St Mary the Virgin, Prestwich
 St Mary's Church, Stockport

Hampshire
 St Mary's Church, Ashley
 St. Mary's Church, Bishopstoke
 St Mary's Church, Fordingbridge
 St Mary's Church, Hartley Wintney
 St. Mary's Church, Hayling Island
 St Mary's Church, Itchen Stoke
 St Mary's Church, Micheldever
 St Mary's Church, Portsea
 Old Church of St Mary the Virgin, Preston Candover
 St Mary's Church, Selborne
 St. Mary's Church, South Stoneham
 St. Mary's Church, Southampton
 St Mary's Church, Twyford

Herefordshire
 St Mary's Church, Wormsley
 St Mary the Virgin's Church, Yazor

Hertfordshire
 Church of St. Mary the Virgin, Baldock
 St Mary Magdalene's Church, Caldecote
 St Mary's Church, Hemel Hempstead
 St. Mary's Church, Hitchin
 St Mary's Church, Little Hormead
 St. Mary's Church, Northchurch
 St. Mary's Church, Watford
 St Mary's Church, Welwyn
 St Mary the Virgin's Church, Yazor

Isle of Wight
 St. Mary's Church, Brading
 St. Mary's Church, Brighstone
 St. Mary's Church, Brook
 St. Mary's Church, Carisbrooke
 St. Mary's Church, Cowes

Kent
 St Mary's Parish Church, Ashford
 St Mary's Church, Burham
 St Mary's Church, Capel-le-Ferne
 St Mary's Church, Dover
 St Mary's Church, Eastwell
 Church of St Mary the Virgin, Fordwich
 St. Mary's Church, Hadlow
 St Mary's Church, Higham
 St Mary's Church, Lamberhurst
 St Mary's Church, Leigh
 St Mary's Church, Lenham
 St Mary's Church, Luddenham
 St Mary's Church, Nettlestead
 St Mary's Church, Reculver, founded 669 and demolished 1809
 Church of St Mary the Virgin, Reculver
 St Mary's Church, Sandwich
 St Mary the Virgin Church, Thurnham
 St Mary's Church, Walmer
 St Mary the Virgin Church, Westerham
 St. Mary's Church, Chilham
 St. Mary's Church, Selling

Lancashire
 Church of St Mary le Ghyll, Barnoldswick
 Church of St Mary and St Michael, Bonds
 St Mary's Church, Borwick
 Church of St Mary of the Assumption, Burnley
 St Mary's Church, Fernyhalgh
 St Mary's Church, Fleetwood
 St Mary's Church, Goosnargh
 St Mary's Church, Mellor
 St Mary's Church, Morecambe
 St Mary's Church, Newchurch in Pendle
 St Mary's Church, Penwortham
 St Mary's Church, Preston
 St Mary Magdalen's Church, Ribbleton
 St Mary's Church, Tarleton
 St Mary's and All Saints Church, Whalley
 St Mary's Church, Yealand Conyers

Leicestershire
 St Mary's Church, Anstey
 St Mary's Church, Barkby
 St Mary's Church, Bitteswell
 St Mary the Virgin's Church, Bottesford
 St Mary's Church, Brentingby
 St Mary's Church, Garthorpe
 St Mary's Church, Loughborough
 St Mary's Church, Melton Mowbray
 St Mary's Church, Queniborough

Lincolnshire
 St Mary's Church, Barnetby
 St Mary's Church, Barton-upon-Humber
 St Mary's Church, Grantham
 St Mary's Church, Grimsby
 St Mary and St Peter's Church, Harlaxton
 St Mary's Church, Horncastle
 Lincoln Cathedral (Cathedral Church of the Blessed Virgin Mary of Lincoln)
 Stow Minster (The Minster Church of St Mary, Stow-in-Lindsey)
 St Mary's Church, North Cockerington
 St Mary's Church, Stamford
 St Mary's Church, Welton

London
 St Mary Abchurch
 St Mary Aldermary
 St Mary-at-Hill
 St Mary's Church, Barnes
 St Mary's Church, Battersea
 St Mary the Boltons
 St Mary's Church, Charing Cross Road
 St Mary the Virgin's church, Chessington
 St Mary's Roman Catholic Church, Clapham
 St Mary's Church, Downe
 St Mary the Virgin, East Barnet
 St Mary's Church, Edmonton
 St Mary-at-Finchley Church
 St Mary's Church, Greenwich
 St Mary's Chapel (Hampstead)
 St Mary's Parish Church, Hampton
 St. Mary's Church, Hanwell
 St. Mary's, Harrow on the Hill
 St Mary's Church, Hendon
 St Mary's Church, Ilford
 St Mary's Church, Islington
 St Mary's, Bryanston Square
 St Mary the Virgin, Monken Hadley
 St Mary the Virgin Mortlake
 St. Mary's Church, Putney
 St. Mary's Church, Rotherhithe
 St Mary's Church, Somers Town
 St. Mary's New Church, Stoke Newington (parish)
 St. Mary's Old Church, Stoke Newington
 St Mary's Church, Summerstown
 St Mary with St Alban
 St Mary's Church, Tottenham
 St Mary's, Twickenham
 St. Mary's Church, Walthamstow
 St Mary's Church, Welling
 St Mary's Church, Wimbledon
 St Mary's Greek Orthodox Church, also known as St Mary's Cathedral
 St Mary-le-Bow
 St Mary le Strand
 St Mary Woolnoth

Merseyside
 Prescot Parish Church, dedicated to St Mary
 St Mary's Church, Billinge
 St Mary's Church, Eastham
 St Mary's Church, Grassendale
 St Mary's Church, Knowsley
 St Mary's Church, Presbytery and Convent, Little Crosby
 St Mary's Church, Walton-on-the-Hill
 St Mary's Church, Wavertree
 St Mary's Church, West Derby, Liverpool
 St Mary's Church, Woolton

Norfolk
 St Mary's Church, Barton Bendish
 St Mary's Church, East Bradenham
 St Mary's Church, East Ruston
 St Mary's Church, Elsing
 St Mary's Church, Fordham
 St Mary's Church, Heacham
 St Mary's Church, Holme-next-the-Sea
 St Mary's Church, Islington, Norfolk
 St Mary's Church, Moulton
 St Mary the Virgin's Church, Wiggenhall

Northamptonshire
 St. Mary's Church, Higham Ferrers
 St Mary the Virgin's Church, Maidwell
 St Mary Magdalene, Geddington

North Yorkshire
 St Mary's Church, Birdforth
 St Mary's Church, Conistone
 St Mary the Virgin's Church, Great Ouseburn
 St Mary's Church, Harrogate
 Church of St Mary, Lastingham
 St Mary's Church, Lead
 Church of St Mary the Virgin, Masham
 St Mary's Church, Roecliffe
 St Mary's Church, Scarborough
 St Mary's Church, South Cowton
 St Mary's Church, Stainburn
 St Mary's, Studley Royal
 St Mary's Church, Tadcaster
 Church of Saint Mary, Whitby

Northumberland
 St Mary's Church, Hexham
 St Mary's, High Church

Nottinghamshire
 St. Mary's Church, Arnold
 St. Mary's Church, Attenborough
 St. Mary's Church, Barnstone
 St Mary's Church, Bleasby
 St Mary's Church, Bunny
 St Mary's Church, Car Colston
 St Mary's Church, Carlton-on-Trent
 Church of St Mary the Virgin, Clumber Park
 St Mary's Church, East Leake
 St Mary's Church, Edwinstowe
 St. Mary's Church, Greasley
 St Mary's Church, Lowdham
 St Mary's Church, Norton Cuckney
 St Mary's Church, Nottingham
 Church of St Mary the Virgin, Plumtree
 St. Mary's Church, Radcliffe on Trent
 St Mary the Virgin's Church, West Stockwith
 St. Mary's Church, Westwood
 St. Mary's Church, Wollaton Park
 St Mary's Church, Worksop

Oxfordshire
 St Mary's Church, Banbury
 St Mary the Virgin's Church, Black Bourton
 St Mary's Church, Chastleton
 St Mary's Church, Newnham Murren
 St Mary's Church, North Leigh
 University Church of St Mary the Virgin, Oxford
 Chapel of St Mary at Smith Gate, Oxford
 St Mary's Church, Pyrton

Rutland
 St Mary the Virgin's Church, Ayston

Shropshire
 St Mary's Church, Acton Burnell
 St Mary Magdalene's Church, Battlefield
 Church of St Mary, Bitterley
 Church of St. Mary Magdalene, Bridgnorth
 St Mary the Virgin's Church, Bromfield
 St Mary's Church, Burford
 St Mary's Church, Cleobury Mortimer
 St Mary's Church, Edstaston
 St Mary's Church, Ellesmere
 St Mary's Church, Hopesay
 St Mary's Church, Madeley
 St Mary's Church, Shrewsbury

Somerset
 Church of St Mary the Virgin, Barrington
 Church of St Mary the Virgin, Batcombe
 St Mary's Church, Bathwick
 St Mary the Virgin's Church, Bathwick
 Church of St Mary, Berrow
 Church of St Mary, Bishops Lydeard
 Church of St Mary, Bridgwater
 Church of St Mary & All Saints, Broomfield
 Church of St Mary, Bruton
 Church of St Mary, Cannington
 Church of St Mary the Virgin, Chard
 St Mary Magdalene's Church, Charlcombe
 Church of St Mary, Chedzoy
 Church of St Mary Magdalene, Chewton Mendip
 Church of St Mary, Christon
 Church of St Mary the Virgin, Croscombe
 Church of St Mary Magdalene, Ditcheat
 Church of St Mary, East Brent
 Church of St Mary the Virgin, East Stoke
 Church of St Mary Magdalene, Great Elm
 Church of St Mary, Hardington
 Church of St Mary, Hemington
 Church of St Mary, Ilminster
 Church of St Mary the Virgin, Isle Abbotts
 Church of St Mary, Kingston St Mary
 Church of St Mary, Litton
 Church of St Mary, Luccombe
 Church of St Mary, Marston Magna
 Church of St Mary, Meare
 Church of St Mary, Moorlinch
 Church of St Mary, Mudford
 Church of St Mary, Nempnett Thrubwell
 Church of St Mary the Virgin, Nettlecombe
 Church of St Mary, North Petherton
 Church of St Mary the Virgin, Norton Sub Hamdon
 Church of St Mary, Orchardlea
 St Mary's Church, Portbury
 Church of St Mary, Rimpton
 St Mary's Church, Saltford
 Church of St Mary, Spaxton
 Church of St Mary the Virgin, Stanton Drew
 Church of St Mary Magdalene, Stocklinch
 Church of St Mary, Stogumber
 Church of St Nicholas and the Blessed Virgin Mary, Stowey
 St Mary Magdalene, Taunton
 Church of St Mary, Wedmore
 Church of St Mary, West Buckland
 Church of St Mary the Virgin, Westonzoyland
 Church of St Mary and St Peter, Winford
 Church of St Mary Magdalene, Winsford
 Church of St Mary, Witham Friary
 Church of St Mary, Woolavington
 Church of St Mary, Yatton

South Yorkshire
 St Mary's Church, Barnsley
 Church of St Mary the Virgin, Beighton
 St Mary's Church, Bolsterstone
 St Mary's Church, Bramall Lane
 St Mary's Church, Handsworth, Sheffield
 St Mary's Church, Tickhill
 Church of St Mary, Wheatley
 Church of St Mary the Virgin, Sprotbrough

Staffordshire
 St Mary's Church, Blymhill
 St Mary the Virgin's Church, Bromfield
 St Mary and St Modwen Church, Burton-on-Trent
 St Mary's and All Saints' Church, Checkley
 St Mary's Church, Lichfield
 St Mary's Church, Patshull
 St. Mary the Virgin Church, Uttoxeter
 St. Mary's Catholic Church, Uttoxeter

Suffolk
 St Mary's Church, Akenham
 St Mary's Church, Badley
 St Mary's Church, Bungay
 St Mary the Virgin's Church, Cavendish
 St Mary's Church, Chilton
 St Mary's Church, Ickworth
 St Mary's Church, Redgrave
 St Mary's Church, Rickinghall Superior
 St Mary the Virgin's Church, Stonham Parva
 St Mary's Church, Washbrook

Surrey
 St Mary's Church, Ewell
 Church of St. Mary, Fetcham
 Church of St Mary the Virgin, Horsell
 St Mary's, Staines
 Church of St Mary, Stanwell
 St Mary's Oatlands, Surrey

Teesside
 St. Mary's Church, Longnewton

Tyne and Wear
 St Mary's Church, Sunderland

Warwickshire
 St. Mary's Church, Atherstone
 St. Mary's Church, Leamington Spa
 St Mary's Church, Warwick

West Midlands
 St. Mary's Church, Aldridge
 St Mary's Church, Handsworth
 St Mary's Church, Moseley
 St Mary's Church, Selly Oak
 St Mary's Church, Temple Balsall
 St Mary's Church, Walsgrave
 St Mary's Church, Walsall
 St Mary & All Saints, Walsall
 St Mary and St John Church, Wolverhampton

West Sussex
 St. Mary's Church, Broadwater
 St Mary's Church, Goring-by-Sea
 St Mary the Virgin's Church, North Stoke
 St Mary's Church, Shipley
 St Mary de Haura Church, Shoreham-by-Sea
 St Mary Our Lady, Sidlesham
 St Mary's Church, Slaugham
 Church of St Mary the Blessed Virgin, Sompting
 St Mary's Church, Walberton
 St Mary's Church, West Chiltington

West Yorkshire
 St. Mary the Virgin Church, Boston Spa
 St. Mary's Church, Garforth
 St Mary's Church, Halifax
 St Mary the Virgin's Church, Middleton
 St Mary's in the Wood Church, Morley
 St. Mary's Church, Swillington

Wiltshire
 St Mary's Church, Calne
 St Mary's Church, Chute Forest
 St. Mary's Church, East Knoyle
 St Mary's Church, Maddington
 St Mary's Church, Marlborough
 St Mary's Church, Old Dilton
 St Mary's Church, Purton
 St Mary's Church, Shrewton
 St Mary's Church, South Tidworth
 St Mary's Church, Wilton

Worcestershire
 St Mary's Church, Wythall

Northern Ireland
 Church of the Blessed Virgin Mary, Derrytrasna, County Armagh
 St Mary's Church of Ireland Parish Church, Macosquin, County Londonderry
 St Mary’s RC Church, Macosquin, County Londonderry
 St Mary's Church of Ireland, Newry
 St Mary's, Chapel Street (formerly Newry Cathedral), Newry

Scotland
 St Mary's Church, Auchindoir, Aberdeenshire
 Church of St Mary the Virgin, Arbroath, Angus
 St Mary's Episcopal Church, Dunblane, Stirling
 St Mary's Church, Stirling
 St Mary's Collegiate Church, Haddington, East Lothian
 Dairsie Old Church, formerly St Mary's Church, Fife
 St Mary's Church, Cove Bay, Aberdeenshire
 Dundee Parish Church (St Mary's)
 St Mary's Chapel, Wyre, Orkney
 St Mary's Chapel, Rattray, Aberdeenshire
 Chapel of St. Mary, Colonsay, Argyll
 St Mary, Our Lady of Victories Church, Dundee
 Priory Church, South Queensferry, or St Mary's Episcopal Church, South Queensferry
 Church of St Mary on the Rock, St Andrews
 Saint Mary's, Calton, Glasgow
 St. Mary's Parish Church, Kirkintilloch
 St Mary's Cathedral, Edinburgh (Episcopal), Edinburgh
 St Mary's, Fochabers, Moray

Wales
Anglesey
 St Mary's Church, Bodewryd
 St Mary's Church, Holyhead
 St Mary's Church, Llanfair Mathafarn Eithaf
 St Mary's Church, Llanfairpwllgwyngyll
 St Mary's Church, Llanfair-yng-Nghornwy
 St Mary's Church, Llanfair-yn-Neubwll
 St Mary's Church, Llanfair-yn-y-Cwmwd
 St Mary's Church, Llannerch-y-medd
 St Mary's Church, Menai Bridge
 St Mary's Church, Pentraeth
 St Mary's Church, Rhodogeidio
 St Mary's Church, Tal-y-llyn

Bridgend
 St Mary's Church, Coity Higher

Cardiff
 St Mary's Church, Cardiff, collapsed and abandoned c. 1700

Carmarthenshire
 St Mary's Church, Llanfair-ar-y-bryn
 St Mary's Church, Llanllwch
 Church of Saint Mary, Kidwelly

Ceredigion
 St. Mary's Church, Cardigan

Conwy
 St Mary's Church, Betws-y-Coed
 Church of St Mary & All Saints, Conwy
 St Mary's Church, Llanrwst, demolished

Denbighshire
 St Mary's Church, Derwen
 St Mary's Church, Betws Gwerful Goch

Flintshire
 St Mary's Church, Cilcain
 Church of St Mary the Virgin, Halkyn
 St Mary's Church, Mold

Gwynedd
 St Mary's Church, Penllech

Monmouthshire
 Priory Church of St Mary, Abergavenny
 St Mary's Church, Caldicot
 St Mary's Church, Chepstow
 Church of St Mary the Virgin, Llanfair Kilgeddin
 St Mary's Church, Magor
 St Mary's Priory Church, Monmouth
 Prior Church of St Mary, Usk

Neath Port Talbot
 St Mary's Church, Aberavon

Newport
 St Mary's Church, Llanwern
 St Mary's Church, Malpas, Newport
 St Mary's Church, Marshfield, Newport
 St Mary's Church, Nash, Newport
 St Mary's Church, Whitsun

Pembrokeshire
 St Mary's Church, Haverfordwest
 St Mary's Church, Tenby

Powys
 St Mary's Church, Brecon

Swansea
 St Mary's Church, Pennard
 St Mary's Church, Swansea

Vale of Glamorgan
 St Mary Church, Llanfair, Vale of Glamorgan

Isle of Man
See List of churches on the Isle of Man
 St Mary (Abbey Church), Ballasalla
 St Mary (Old Church), Ballaugh (defunct)
 St Mary de Ballaugh, Ballaugh
 St Mary's Catholic Church, Castletown
 St. Mary's on the Harbour, Castletown
 St. Mary of the Isle Church, Douglas
 St Mary, Port St Mary
 Ballure Church (St Mary's), Ballure, Isle of Man

United States

Alabama
 St. Mary of the Visitation Catholic Church (Huntsville, Alabama)

Arizona
 Saint Mary's Catholic Church (Kingman, Arizona)
 St. Mary's Church-Our Lady of Mount Carmel Catholic Church
 St. Mary's Basilica (Phoenix), Arizona, also known and the National Register of Historic Places (NRHP)-listed as St. Mary's Church
 St. Mary's Episcopal Church (Phoenix)

Arkansas
 St. Mary's Catholic Church (Helena-West Helena, Arkansas)

California
 St. Mary Coptic Orthodox Church (Los Angeles)

Colorado
 St. Mary's Catholic Church (Colorado Springs, Colorado)

Connecticut
 St. Mary Church (Bridgeport, Connecticut)
 St. Mary's Church (Coventry, Connecticut)
 St. Mary's Church (Greenwich, Connecticut)
 St. Mary's Church (New Haven, Connecticut)
 St. Mary Parish (Newington, Connecticut)
 St. Mary Church (Norwalk, Connecticut)
 St. Mary's Church (Norwich, Connecticut)
 St. Mary's Church (Stamford, Connecticut)

Delaware 
 St. Mary of the Immaculate Conception Church (Wilmington, Delaware)

Florida
 St. Mary's Episcopal Church (Green Cove Springs, Florida)

Georgia 
 Saint Mary's Catholic Church (Rome, Georgia)

Idaho
 St. Mary's Catholic Church (Boise, Idaho)
 St. Mary's Catholic Church (Caldwell, Idaho)

Illinois
 St. Mary's Church (Beaverville, Illinois)
 St. Mary's Church of Gilberts
 St. Mary of the Woods Catholic Church, in Chicago, Illinois
 St. Mary's Roman Catholic Church, included in Sycamore Historic District

Indiana
 St. Mary's Catholic Church (Huntington, Indiana)
 St. Mary's Catholic Church (Indianapolis, Indiana)

Iowa
 Holy Family Catholic Church (Fort Madison, Iowa) (St. Mary of the Assumption Church)
 St. Mary of the Visitation Catholic Church (Ottumwa, Iowa)
 St. Mary's Catholic Church (Davenport, Iowa)
 Saint Mary's Catholic Church (Dubuque, Iowa)
 St. Mary's Catholic Church (Guttenberg, Iowa)
 St. Mary's Church and Rectory (Iowa City, Iowa)
 St. Mary's Catholic Church (Nichols, Iowa)
 St. Mary's Catholic Church (Riverside, Iowa)

Kansas
 St. Mary's Catholic Church (Purcell, Kansas)
 St. Mary's Church (St. Benedict, Kansas)

Maine
 St. Mary's Church (Augusta, Maine)

Maryland
 St. Mary's Catholic Church (Bryantown, Maryland)
 St. Mary's Church (Emmorton, Maryland)
 St. Mary's Roman Catholic Church (Newport, Maryland)

Massachusetts
 St. Mary's Church (Dedham, Massachusetts)
 St. Mary's Episcopal Church (Dorchester, Massachusetts)
 St. Mary's Episcopal Church (Newton Lower Falls, Massachusetts)
 St. Peter's Roman Catholic Church-St. Mary's School (Southbridge, Massachusetts)
 St. Mary's Roman Catholic Church Complex (Waltham, Massachusetts)
 St. Mary's Catholic Church (Winchester, Massachusetts)

Michigan
 Saint Mary of Good Counsel Catholic Church (Adrian, Michigan)
 St. Mary Roman Catholic Church (Detroit, Michigan)
 St. Mary's Catholic Church (Gaylord, Michigan), listed as a Michigan State Historic Site
 St. Mary Church (Lansing)
 St. Mary Star of the Sea Catholic Church (Jackson, Michigan)
 St. Mary's Church Complex Historic District (Monroe, Michigan)
 St. Mary's Pro-Cathedral (Sault Ste. Marie, Michigan)

Minnesota
 Church of St. Mary (Melrose, Minnesota)
 Saint Mary's Church of the Purification (Shakopee, Minnesota)

Missouri
 St. Mary's Church (Adair, Missouri), listed on the NRHP in Missouri
 St. Mary's Parish (Bridgeton, Missouri)

Montana
 St. Mary's Mission (Montana) (St. Mary's Church and Pharmacy), Stevensville

New Hampshire
 Ste. Marie Church (Manchester, New Hampshire)

New Jersey
 St. Mary's Church (South River, New Jersey)
 Saint Mary of Mount Virgin Roman Catholic Church, New Brunswick

New York
 St. Mary's Church (Albany, New York)
 St. Mary's Church (Ballston Spa, New York)
 Church of Saint Mary the Virgin (Chappaqua, New York)
 St. Mary's Church (Rochester, New York)
 St. Mary's Church (Swormville, New York)
 St. Mary's-in-Tuxedo, Tuxedo Park, New York
 St. Mary's Church (Wappingers Falls, New York)

 New York City
 St. Mary's Church (Bronx)
 St. Mary's Church (Grand Street, Manhattan)
 St. Mary's Church (69th Street, Manhattan)
 St. Mary's Church (Staten Island)
 St. Mary's Episcopal Church (Brooklyn)
 St. Mary Magdalen's Church (New York City), Manhattan
 St. Margaret Mary's Church (Bronx)
 Church of St. Mary the Virgin (Manhattan)
 St. Mary & St. Antonios Coptic Orthodox Church, Queens

North Carolina
 St. Mary Catholic Church (Greensboro, North Carolina)
 St. Mary's Episcopal Church (Asheville, North Carolina)
 St. Mary's Chapel (Hillsborough, North Carolina)
 St. Mary's Chapel (Raleigh, North Carolina)

North Dakota
 St. Mary's Catholic Church (Medora, North Dakota)
 St. Mary's Church Non-Contiguous Historic District, Hague

Ohio
 Old St. Mary's Church (Cincinnati, Ohio)
 Saint Mary of the Assumption Catholic Church, Columbus
 St. Mary's Catholic Church (Delaware, Ohio)
 St. Mary's Roman Catholic Church (Elyria, Ohio)
 St. Mary's Catholic Church (Massillon, Ohio)
 St. Mary of the Immaculate Conception Church (Morges, Ohio)
 St. Mary's Roman Catholic Church (Portsmouth, Ohio)
 St. Mary's Catholic Church (Sandusky, Ohio)
 St. Mary Mother of the Redeemer Church (Toledo, Ohio)

Oregon
 St. Mary's Cathedral (Portland, Oregon)
 St. Mary's Roman Catholic Church (Mount Angel, Oregon)
 St. Mary Roman Catholic Church (Eugene, Oregon)

Pennsylvania
 Blessed Virgin Mary Catholic Church (Darby, Pennsylvania)
 St. Mary Coptic Orthodox Church (Lancaster, Pennsylvania)
 St. Mary's Roman Catholic Church (Philadelphia)
 St. Mary's Church (Pittsburgh)

Rhode Island
 St. Mary's Church and Cemetery (Crompton, Rhode Island)
 St. Mary's Church Complex (Newport, Rhode Island)
 St. Mary's Church of the Immaculate Conception Complex (Pawtucket, Rhode Island)

South Carolina
 St. Mary's Roman Catholic Church (Charleston, South Carolina)

South Dakota
 St. Mary's Catholic Church (Salem, South Dakota)

Tennessee
 St. Mary's Catholic Church (Memphis, Tennessee)
 St. Mary's Catholic Church (Nashville, Tennessee)

Texas
 Cathedral of Saint Mary (Austin, Texas)
 St. Mary's Catholic Church (Brenham, Texas)
 St. Mary's Catholic Church (Fredericksburg, Texas)
 Saint Mary's Catholic Church (Victoria, Texas)
 St. Mary's Church of the Assumption (Praha, Texas)

Virginia
 St. Mary (Alexandria, Virginia); see Lyceum (Alexandria, Virginia)
 St. Mary of the Immaculate Conception Roman Catholic Church (Fredericksburg, Virginia)
 St. Mary's Church (Fairfax Station, Virginia)
 St. Mary's Church (Norfolk, Virginia)

Wisconsin
 Old St. Mary's Church (Milwaukee, Wisconsin)
 St. Mary's Catholic Church (Kaukauna, Wisconsin)
 St. Mary's Parish (Appleton, Wisconsin)
 St. Mary's Roman Catholic Church (Port Washington, Wisconsin)
 St. Mary of the Angels Church and Monastery, Green Bay

Wyoming
 St. Mary's Catholic Cathedral (Cheyenne, Wyoming)

See also
 Iglesia de Santa María (disambiguation)
 St Mary Magdalene Church (disambiguation)
 St. Mary's Cathedral (disambiguation)
 St. Mary's Chapel (disambiguation)
 St. Mary's Assumption Church (disambiguation)
 St. Mary's Basilica (disambiguation)
 St. Mary's Episcopal Church (disambiguation)
 St Mary the Virgin (disambiguation)
 St. Mary's (disambiguation)
 St. Mary and St. Michael's Church (disambiguation)
 Church of the Mother of God (disambiguation)